Hoshiv is a village in the Ivano-Frankivsk Oblast of Ukraine, located about 4 km south east of Bolekhiv and 12 km north west of Dolyna, at around . The village is known for its Basilian monastery which is a place of pilgrimage for the Ukrainian Catholic Church.

Monastery
The monastery at Hoshiv was established in 1570. In the 17th century it was plundered and destroyed by Tatars and later rebuilt at its present location on top of a hill called Yasna Hora, in homage to the Pauline Monastery of Jasna Góra. The present day monastery buildings and church of the Transfiguration were built at the beginning of the 19th century. In 1736 the monastery received from its founders the wonder working icon of the Mother of God, a copy of the Black Madonna of Częstochowa held in the Jasna Góra Monastery in Poland. The monastery was closed by the Soviets in 1950 and could only be restored with the collapse of the Soviet Union in 1991. The monastery is once again a popular destination for pilgrims of the Byzantine Rite in Halychyna.

Chicago Shrine
An outdoor grotto shrine to Our Lady of Hoshiv is located in Chicago on the grounds of St. Joseph the Betrothed Ukrainian Greek Catholic Church. The altar is sometimes used for outdoor services, such as Pascha Blessing. In 2006, a restoration and relandscaping of the grotto into a memorial garden was done, and the space is now dedicated to deceased parishioners.

Gallery

References

External links
 Hoszów (in Polish)

Ukrainian Greek Catholic Church